Coleophora moehringiae is a moth of the family Coleophoridae. It is found in the Italian Alps. Larvae can be found in mid-May and early June. The species needs two years for its development.

References

moehringiae
Moths described in 1967
Endemic fauna of Italy
Moths of Europe